In organic chemistry, when a single organic molecule has two different functional groups, it is called a bifunctional molecule . A bifunctional molecule has the properties of two different types of functional groups, such as an alcohol, amide, aldehyde, nitrile or carboxylic acid. Many bifunctional molecules are used to produce medicines and catalysts, while others are used in condensation polymerization like polyester and polyamide. In organic molecules, functional groups are atoms or molecules that are responsible for the characteristic properties of that molecule, with the exceptions of double and triple bonds, which are also functional groups.

See also
 Functionality (chemistry)

References

Further reading
 Properties of Single Organic Molecules on Crystal Surfaces

Functional groups
Organic chemistry